Joanka may refer to the following places:
Joanka, Kalisz County in Greater Poland Voivodeship (west-central Poland)
Joanka, Kępno County in Greater Poland Voivodeship (west-central Poland)
Joanka, Poznań County in Greater Poland Voivodeship (west-central Poland)